Totò vs. the Black Pirate is a 1964 Italian adventure-comedy film written and directed by Fernando Cerchio.

Plot 
José is a Neapolitan petty thief who escaping from the guards for a small theft hides himself in a barrel of  Jamaican rum of on the quay of the port of Naples. The barrel get placed, however, on a pirate ship, so the man will have to face a horde of pirates to save his life.

Cast 

Totò as Josè
Mario Petri as The Black Pirate 
Aldo Giuffré as Lt. Burrasca
Grazia Maria Spina as  Isabella
Mario Castellani as  Uncino
Pietro Carloni as  The  Governor
Aldo Bufi Landi as  Manolo 
Giacomo Furia as  Don Carlos d'Aragona
Franco Ressel as  The Spanish Commander

References

External links

1964 films
Films directed by Fernando Cerchio
Films scored by Carlo Rustichelli
Italian adventure comedy films
Pirate films
1960s adventure comedy films
1964 comedy films
1960s Italian-language films
1960s Italian films